Germany has officially participated in the biennial classical music competition Eurovision Young Musicians 14 times since its debut in 1982, winning the inaugural contest that year. Before German reunification in 1990, it was presented as West Germany, representing the Federal Republic of Germany. East Germany (the German Democratic Republic) did not compete. Germany won again in 1996 and have hosted the contest twice, in 2002 and 2014.

Participation overview

Hostings

See also
Germany in the Eurovision Song Contest
Germany in the Eurovision Dance Contest
Germany in the Junior Eurovision Song Contest
Germany in the Türkvizyon Song Contest

Notes and references

Footnotes

References

External links
 Eurovision Young Musicians

Countries in the Eurovision Young Musicians